Marion Bonner Mitchell (28 November 1926 – 3 October 2014) was an American literary scholar specializing in French and Italian literature of the Renaissance period.

Mitchell was born in Livingston, Texas, on 28 November 1926 to parents Jewel Clarence and Verna Bonner Mitchell. He completed bachelor's and master's degrees at the University of Texas at Austin before obtaining a doctorate at Ohio State University. During his studies, Mitchell received the Fulbright Scholarship in Paris. He returned to the city for military service as a railway station interpreter during the Korean War.  Mitchell joined the University of Missouri faculty in 1958, was later elected a fellow of the Royal Society of Arts and upon retirement, was granted emeritus status. He died on 3 October 2014.

Selected publications

References

People from Livingston, Texas
University of Texas at Austin alumni
Historians from Texas
American literary historians
1928 births
2014 deaths
20th-century American male writers
20th-century American historians
Historians of French literature
Historians of Italy
Ohio State University alumni
University of Missouri faculty
Historians of the Renaissance